Żerkowice  (German Zirkowitz) is a part of city of Opole (before 2017 a village in the administrative district of Gmina Komprachcice, within Opole County, Opole Voivodeship, in south-western Poland).

References

Villages in Opole County